Prasana Kumar Samuel is an Anglican bishop in the Church of South India: he has been Bishop of Karnataka Central since 2009.

Samuel was born in the Kolar Gold Fields. He was educated at Union Biblical Seminary, Yavatmal. He served two spells as Karnataka Central Diocesan Secretary before his consecration as its bishop.

References

Anglican bishops of Karnataka Central
Living people
21st-century Anglican bishops
People from Kolar district
Year of birth missing (living people)